William Sidebottom (5 February 1836 – 28 June 1932) was an Australian politician.

Sidebottom was born in Evandale in Tasmania in 1836. In 1885 he was elected to the Tasmanian House of Assembly, representing the seat of Selby. He served until 1893. He died in 1932 in Launceston.

References

1836 births
1932 deaths
Members of the Tasmanian House of Assembly